Ronda Whyte (born 6 November 1990) is a Jamaican track and field athlete who specializes in the 400 metres hurdles. She represented Jamaica at the 2019 World Athletics Championships, competing in women's 400 metres hurdles.

She has qualified to represent Jamaica at the 2020 Summer Olympics.

References

Jamaican female hurdlers
1990 births
Living people
World Athletics Championships athletes for Jamaica
Central American and Caribbean Games medalists in athletics
Central American and Caribbean Games gold medalists for Jamaica
Competitors at the 2018 Central American and Caribbean Games
Athletes (track and field) at the 2020 Summer Olympics
Olympic athletes of Jamaica